Kelsey Nichole Turner (born May 5, 1993), also known as Badd Barbie, is an American convicted murderer and former model. She has appeared in magazines such as Playboy, Maxim, and OneTen.

In 2019, Turner and her ex-boyfriend were accused of killing a Salinas psychiatrist, Dr. Thomas Burchard. She was arrested by FBI agents and Las Vegas police in Stockton, California, on March 21, 2019, and underwent a criminal trial for three years. She eventually pleaded guilty and was sentenced to 10 to 25 years in prison in January 2023.

Early life and education
Turner was born on May 5, 1993, in Norfolk, Virginia, and grew up in Jonesboro, Arkansas. She completed her education at Arkansas State University. Later, she started fashion modeling as a lingerie and swimsuit model. During her modeling days, she lived in Salinas, California and Las Vegas, Nevada.

Career
Turner started her career in fashion modeling as a lingerie and swimsuit model and worked with Maxim, Playboy, Players Magazine, Fire and Ice, Modelmania, and OneTen magazines. Turner is also known for her appearance in movies, including The Promise in 2011 and Wally got Wasted in 2018. Turner also started Badd Barbie, an apparel company, with a partner in 2021.

Murder of Dr. Thomas Burchard
Turner and her ex-boyfriend Jon "Logan" Kennison have been in custody since 2019 for the murder of Dr. Thomas Burchard, a child psychiatrist. They are accused of beating the 71 year old psychiatrist to death with a baseball bat, then stuffing his body into the trunk of Turner's Mercedes.

Judy Earp, the victim's fiancé, claims that Burchard had given Turner around $750,000 to be his “sugar baby” over the period of several years. Earp claims Burchard's last words to her were: "She’s such a pervasive liar that I have to see for myself." 

Burchard's body was discovered in the trunk of Turner's vehicle, which had been abandoned on a desert road outside Las Vegas.

Turner was arrested by FBI agents and Las Vegas police in Stockton, California, on March 21, 2019. Her trial lasted three years. In July 2022, in the wake of Kennison pleading guilty, she agreed to accept an Alford guilty plea. On November 9, 2022, she signed the plea deal, despite maintaining her innocence. On January 10, 2023, she was sentenced to 10 to 25 years in prison. 

Kennison pleaded guilty in June 2022 to second-degree murder with a deadly weapon and conspiracy to commit murder. He was sentenced to 18 to 45 years for his role in the murder. A roommate of the couple, Diana Nicole Pena, pleaded guilty to being an accessory to murder and provided prosecutors with critical evidence.

Personal life
Turner is currently incarcerated at the Florence McClure Women's Correctional Center in Nevada.

References

Living people
1993 births
American female models
American female murderers
American people convicted of murder
Playboy Playmates
People from Norfolk, Virginia
People from Jonesboro, Arkansas
Arkansas State University alumni
People convicted of murder by Nevada